Polymastia may refer to:
Accessory breasts
Polymastia (sponge), a genus of sponge